Rolleston-on-Dove railway station is a disused railway station built to serve Rolleston on Dove in Staffordshire.

History 

The station was opened by the North Staffordshire Railway in 1894 as simply "Rolleston" but was renamed to avoid confusion with Rolleston Junction station.

The line had been opened in 1848 and, from 1878, was shared by the Great Northern Railway (Great Britain) with its GNR Derbyshire and Staffordshire Extension .

The station was about a mile from the village. It was provided with two brick-built platforms and timber buildings. A goods loop ran behind the secondary platform to serve the station yard.  Rolleston-on-Dove station closed in 1949.

Present day 

Although the platforms can still be seen, the timber buildings were demolished in the 1960s. A replica of the former running in board has been erected on one of the platforms.

References

Further reading

Disused railway stations in Staffordshire
Railway stations in Great Britain opened in 1894
Railway stations in Great Britain closed in 1949
Former North Staffordshire Railway stations